Aronba Wari (English: Secret Story) is a 2020 Indian Meitei language film directed by OC Meira and produced by Rajkumari Nalini Devi, under the banner of Seuti Films. It stars Shilheiba Ningthoujam, Suraj Ngashepam, Bala Hijam and Sushmita Mangsatabam in the lead roles. The movie is based on Sarungbam Binodini Devi's novel Minoktugi Marumda. It was initially slated to be released on 21 March 2020 but postponed due to the COVID-19 pandemic. The film was premiered on 11 October 2020 at Manipur State Film Development Society (MSFDS), Imphal.

Aronba Wari had its regular theatrical run at Friends Talkies, Paona Bazar in March 2021.

Cast
 Shilheiba Ningthoujam as Henthoi
 Suraj Ngashepam
 Bala Hijam as Mainoubi
 Sushmita Mangsatabam as Yaiphabi
 Denny Likmabam as Henthoi's father
 Maya Choudhury as Yaiphabi's mother
 Bala Tensubam as Thoibi
 Idhou
 Thongam Thoithoi
 Tej Kshetri as Tunan
 Laimayum Gaitri
 Sunil Myboy
 Irom Shyamkishore
 Roji Brahmacharimayum
 Lilabati Chanam
 Khoirom Loya
 Suhela Paonam

Soundtrack
Nanao Sagolmang composed the songs for the movie and Manaobi MM wrote the lyrics. The film has four songs and the video song copyrights for YouTube release were procured by Mami Taibang.

Accolades
The film won three awards at the 14th Manipur State Film Awards 2022.

See also 
 List of Meitei-language films

References

2020 films
Meitei-language films